Veenod a/l Subramaniam (born 31 March 1988 in Penang, Malaysia) is a Malaysian footballer who last played as a midfielder for Sarawak United in the Malaysia Premier League.

Veenod started off as a striker in his early days with Penang before Selangor's former head coach Irfan Bakti tried him out as a defensive midfielder in 2012 Malaysia Cup.

Veenod also was used as an attacking midfielder or as a right winger under Selangor's head coach P. Maniam.

Club career
Veenod started taking football seriously at age 17. Before turning to football, Veenod was one of the most feared marathon runners in Penang. He represented his school and district in the 3000 metres steeplechase and 5000 metres. Veenod was absorbed into Bintang Biru Football Academy at his youth. He also represented his state in the Under-19 Youth Cup before getting promoted to the Penang President Cup team.

In 2008, Veenod made a huge break into Penang first team. In 2011, Veenod signed a contract with USM. During 2012 Malaysia Cup campaign he was loaned to Selangor and made 6 appearances and 1 goal during the tournament.

On 7 November 2012, it was announced that Veenod moved to Selangor permanently from USM for the 2013 Malaysia Super League.

On 22 November 2017, Veenod signed a two-year contract with Kelantan. On 6 February 2018, Veenod made his debut for Kelantan in a 1–1 draw against Terengganu coming off from the bench for Nik Akif. He was released by Kelantan in April 2018.

On 30 May 2018, Veenod signed a contract with Melaka United.

International career
Veenod made his debut for the Malaysia national team on 6 September 2016, as an early substitute for the injured Brendan Gan on the 17th minute of a friendly match against Indonesia, which Malaysia lost 0–3.

Career statistics

Club

International

Honours

Club
Selangor
Malaysia Super League: Runner-up 2013, 2014
Malaysia Cup: 2015, Runner-up 2016

References

External links
 
 

Malaysian footballers
Malaysia international footballers
Living people
1988 births
Tamil sportspeople
Malaysian people of Tamil descent
Malaysian sportspeople of Indian descent
Malaysian Hindus
Penang F.C. players
Selangor FA players
Kelantan FA players
Melaka United F.C. players
People from Penang
Malaysia Super League players
Association football midfielders
Sportspeople from Penang